This is a list of South American nations by gross domestic product per capita based on purchasing power parity.

IMF list 

List according to the International Monetary Fund in current international dollars for 2018.

World Bank list 

All figures are in 2017 international dollars according to the World Bank, and rounded to the nearest whole number.

CIA list 

All figures are in current international dollars according to The World Factbook by the Central Intelligence Agency, rounded to the nearest hundred.

See also 

List of South American countries by GDP (nominal) per capita

References

South America
GDP (PPP) per capita
GDP (PPP) per capita